HV 11423 (PMMR 114 or 140 LI-SMC) is a red supergiant star in the Small Magellanic Cloud. It is about 200,000 light-years away towards the constellation of Tucana.

Visibility
The spectral type of HV 11423 is variable, from K0-1I in December 2004, to M4I in December 2005, and back to K0-1I by September 2006. Very Large Telescope file spectra show that in December 2001 the star was even cooler (M4-5I). By contrast, in October 1978 and a year later, it appeared as a star of class M0I. The spectral type M4-5 is the latest observed in a supergiant of the Small Magellanic Cloud.

Characteristics

HV 11423 is one of the largest known stars with an estimated radius over 1,000 times larger than the sun. It is also a variable star with a variation of up 2 magnitudes at visual wavelengths but essentially constant in the infrared. It is listed in the General Catalogue of Variable Stars as a slow irregular variable, but a period of 720 days has been calculated, as well as a long secondary period of 1,817 days.

The bolometric luminosity is about 200,000 times more than Sun, making it one of the most luminous cool supergiants, and appears to have remained unchanged during the brightness and spectral variations. It is thought that the star is currently undergoing a period of intense instability, in which its effective temperature changes from 4,300 to 3,300 K in a time scale of months; V-band variability may be due primarily to variations in temperature as well as changes in the local extinction due to the creation and dissipation of circumstellar dust.

References

Stars in the Small Magellanic Cloud
Tucana (constellation)
M-type supergiants
J01005519-7137529
K-type supergiants
Slow irregular variables
Extragalactic stars
PMMR objects
TIC objects